Luciano Amaral da Silva Alves (born 20 October 1982), known as Amaral, is a Brazilian professional footballer who plays as a left back.

Club career
Amaral was born in Campina Grande, Paraíba. After playing with a host of smaller clubs early in his career, he started appearing professionally for Avaí Futebol Clube in 2006, moving to Associação Atlética Caldense that same year.

In 2007, Amaral was signed by Vitória de Guimarães of Portugal from Villa Rio Esporte Clube, as the Minho side had just returned from the second division. He contributed sparingly in the Primeira Liga as they overachieved for a final third place, ahead of S.L. Benfica for a qualification to the UEFA Champions League.

Towards the end of his second season, Amaral was suspended by Vitória and eventually released, returning to his country with América Futebol Clube (RN), still owned by Villa Rio. After two years with Coritiba Foot Ball Club he returned to Portugal also on loan, joining C.S. Marítimo in late May 2010.

References

External links

1982 births
Living people
Brazilian footballers
Association football defenders
Campeonato Brasileiro Série A players
Campeonato Brasileiro Série B players
Campeonato Brasileiro Série C players
Criciúma Esporte Clube players
Joinville Esporte Clube players
Esporte Clube Bahia players
Avaí FC players
Clube de Regatas Brasil players
Villa Rio Esporte Clube players
América Futebol Clube (RN) players
Coritiba Foot Ball Club players
Treze Futebol Clube players
Esporte Clube Internacional de Lages players
ABC Futebol Clube players
Veranópolis Esporte Clube Recreativo e Cultural players
Primeira Liga players
Vitória S.C. players
C.S. Marítimo players
Gil Vicente F.C. players
Cypriot First Division players
Apollon Limassol FC players
Brazilian expatriate footballers
Expatriate footballers in Portugal
Expatriate footballers in Cyprus
Brazilian expatriate sportspeople in Portugal
Brazilian expatriate sportspeople in Cyprus
Sportspeople from Paraíba